Market Place (formerly Market Place by Jasons and Jason's Food & Living) in Hong Kong, Cold Storage Fresh (formerly Market Place, Jasons and Jasons Deli) in Singapore, Mercató (formerly Jasons Food Hall) in Malaysia and The Marketplace (formerly Market Place by Rustan's) in the Philippines is a high-end supermarket chain owned by DFI Retail Group. The chain also has a joint venture in mainland China with Beijing Hualian Group called BHG Market Place and formerly ran stores (Jasons Market Place) in Taiwan until they were sold to Carrefour.

DFI also operates further similar supermarkets under the 3hreeSixty, Jasons ichiba and Oliver's The Delicatessen brands in Hong Kong, and has various other supermarkets around Asia including Wellcome, Cold Storage, Hero and Giant.

History
Jasons Market Place started its business in Singapore in 1975. It was introduced in Taiwan in 2003. In 2007, it opened in Hong Kong's Jardine's Lookout under the name "Market Place by Jasons". In 2012, Jasons Food Hall began operations in the Bangsar Shopping Centre, an upmarket shopping mall in the township of Bangsar, Malaysia, as a replacement for a Cold Storage store. Jasons Market Place in Taiwan was sold to Carrefour in 2020.

Brands

Private labels 
Market Place supermarkets sell products from DFI's Meadows and Yu Pin King private labels.

See also
 Dairy Farm International Holdings
 Cold Storage
 Wellcome

References

External links

 Market Place (Hong Kong)
 Cold Storage Fresh (Singapore)
 Jasons Market Place (Taiwan)

Retail companies established in 1975
Supermarkets of Hong Kong
Supermarkets of Taiwan
Supermarkets of Singapore
DFI Retail Group
1975 establishments in Singapore
Singaporean brands